WLBB (1330 AM, "Newstalk 1330") is a radio station broadcasting a News Talk Information format. Licensed to Carrollton, Georgia, United States, it serves the Carrollton area.  The station is currently owned by Gradick Communications and licensed to WYAI, Inc.  WLBB features programming from Premiere Networks, SRN News, and Westwood One.

The station is an affiliate of the Atlanta Braves radio network, and the current flagship radio station for Clark Howard.

References

External links

LBB
News and talk radio stations in the United States
Radio stations established in 1977